The 2019–20 Northeast Conference men's basketball season began with practices in October 2019, followed by the start of the 2019–20 NCAA Division I men's basketball season in November. Conference play started in January and ended in February 2020.

The NEC tournament was held in March with the higher-seeded team hosting each game. The quarterfinals were played on March 4, the semifinals on March 7, and the championship game on March 10.

Changes from last season
Merrimack College joined the Northeast Conference from Division II Northeast-10 Conference. They are not eligible this year for the NEC tournament.

On October 3, 2018 Long Island University announced that it would combine its two existing athletic programs—NEC member LIU Brooklyn and the Division II program at LIU Post—into a single Division I program under the LIU name. The new LIU program, nicknamed Sharks, maintained LIU Brooklyn's existing memberships in Division I and the NEC.

Head coaches 

Notes: 
 All records, appearances, titles, etc. are from time with current school only. 
 Year at school includes 2019–20 season.
 Overall and NEC/NCAA records are from time at current school and are before the beginning of the 2019–20 season. Because the current LIU athletic program inherited the athletic history of LIU Brooklyn, Kellogg's record includes his two seasons at LIU Brooklyn before the LIU athletic merger.
 Previous jobs are head coaching jobs unless otherwise noted.

Preseason

Preseason coaches poll
Source

() first place votes

Preseason All-NEC team
Source

NEC regular season

Player of the week
Throughout the regular season, the Northeast Conference offices named player(s) of the week and rookie(s) of the week.

Against other conferences

Conference newcomer Merrimack produced the biggest upset of the season for an NEC team when they defeated the Northwestern Wildcats, 71–61. For Merrimack, it was just their second Division I game since moving up from Division II this past season. It was the lone victory for an NEC team against a Power Five conference team; NEC teams produced a 1–15 overall record against that group of schools.

Conference matrix
This table summarizes the head-to-head results between teams in conference play.

All-NEC honors and awards
At the conclusion of the regular season, the conference selects outstanding performers based on a poll of league coaches, below are the results.

Postseason

NEC tournament
The NEC tournament features the top eight eligible teams from the field of eleven participate. The teams are seeded according to their conference records, and when there are similar records between teams, tie-breakers are applied. After the first round, teams are reseeded after each round, with highest remaining seeds receiving home court advantage.

Regular-season champion Merrimack was ineligible under NEC rules as a transitional D-I school. #1 Seed Robert Morris won the NEC tournament for a NEC record 9th time.

NCAA tournament

See also
 2019–20 Northeast Conference women's basketball season

References

External links
NEC website